Plasmogamy is a stage in the sexual reproduction of fungi, in which the protoplasm of two parent cells (usually from the mycelia) fuse without the fusion of nuclei, effectively bringing two haploid nuclei close together in the same cell. This state is followed by karyogamy, where the two nuclei fuse and then undergo meiosis to produce spores.
The dikaryotic state that comes after plasmogamy will often persist for many generations before the fungi undergoes karyogamy. In lower fungi however, plasmogamy is usually immediately followed by karyogamy.  A comparative genomic study indicated the presence of the machinery for plasmogamy, karyogamy and meiosis in the Amoebozoa.

References

Mycology